A number of steamships have carried the name Omsk.

, built for DFDS Line. Torpedoed and sunk on 15 August 1917 by U-84
, transferred to the Soviet Government in 1947, sold to Poland in 1950.

Ship names